Wolfgang Konrad Spohn (born 20 March 1950, in Tübingen) is a German philosopher. He is professor of philosophy and philosophy of science at the University of Konstanz.

Biography 

Wolfgang Spohn studied philosophy, logic and philosophy of science and mathematics at the University of Munich and acquired there the MA (1973) and the Ph.D. (1976) with a thesis on the Grundlagen der Entscheidungstheorie. In his time as an assistant professor he earned the habilitation (1984) with a thesis about Eine Theorie der Kausalität. He held professorships at the University of Regensburg (1986–91), the University of Bielefeld (1991–96), and the University of Konstanz (1996–2018). Since 2019 he is senior professor at the University of Tübingen.

Spohn is editor of the philosophical journal Erkenntnis and was its editor-in-chief from 1988 to 2001. He is a founding member of the Gesellschaft für Analytische Philosophie and was its vice-president from 2006 to 2012. He was a Fellow at the Wissenschaftskolleg zu Berlin (1985/86) and a Distinguished Visiting Professor at the University of California, Irvine (1988). Since 2002 he is a member of the Deutsche Akademie der Naturforscher Leopoldina and since 2015 a member of the Academia Europaea. In 2012 he was the first outside Anglosaxon academia to win the Lakatos Award of the London School of Economics for his book The Laws of Belief. Ranking Theory and its Philosophical Applications. In 2015 he received the Frege Prize of the Gesellschaft für Analytische Philosophie for outstanding achievements of a German speaking philosopher in the field of analytic philosophy.

Spohn is the youngest brother of the historical sociologist Willfried Spohn and of the mathematical physicist Herbert Spohn.

Research 

Spohn is best known for his contributions to formal epistemology, in particular for comprehensively developing ranking theory since 1982, which is his theory of the dynamics of belief. It is an alternative to probability theory and of similar philosophical impact as a formal account of the dynamics of belief. Spohn's research extends to philosophy of science, the theory of causation, metaphysics and ontology, philosophy of language and mind, two-dimensional semantics, philosophical logic, and decision and game theory (see the collection of papers). His dissertation and his paper “Stochastic Independence, Causal Independence, and Shieldability” are precursors of the theory of Bayesian networks and their causal interpretation. His paper “How to Make Sense of Game Theory” is a forerunner of epistemic game theory.

References

External links 
Spohn's homepage at the University of Konstanz

20th-century German philosophers
21st-century German philosophers
Epistemologists
Ludwig Maximilian University of Munich alumni
Metaphysicians
Ontologists
Philosophers of language
Philosophers of mind
Philosophers of science
Academic staff of Bielefeld University
Academic staff of the University of Konstanz
Academic staff of the University of Regensburg
1950 births
Living people
German male writers